Adliswil is a railway station in the Sihl Valley, and the municipality of Adliswil, in the Swiss Canton of Zürich. The station is on the Sihltal line, which is operated by the Sihltal Zürich Uetliberg Bahn (SZU).

The station is served by the following passenger trains:

The station is some  walk from the lower terminus of the Adliswil-Felsenegg cable car, which provides a link to the Felsenegg hill and the Albis ridge. A panoramic footpath runs along that ridge from the upper terminus to Uetliberg station on the SZU's Uetliberg line.

References

External links 
 

Railway stations in the canton of Zürich